Harold Greenwood may refer to:

 Harold Greenwood (ice hockey)
 Harold Greenwood (solicitor)
 Harold Greenwood Henderson